Richard "Dick" Bullock (20 August 1847 –7 February 1920) was a Cornishman who once sang in a Methodist choir and later became a legendary figure of the Wild West Cowboy era. His quick-shooting deeds working on the Deadwood stage gained him the nickname "Deadwood Dick".

Biography
Early in life Bullock's family moved to nearby hamlet of Retew where his father, Captain John Bullock, became the manager of a local clay-works. He and his brother shared many common traits: each very strong, ardent Free Methodists, and great sporting shooters—-a skill that brought him many trophies.

In his mid-twenties, Bullock immigrated to America.  He began working in the Black Hills of South Dakota first as a miner, and then as a bullion guard for the Homestake Mine, which at that time was owned by Senator George Hearst, father of William Randolph Hearst. A bullion guard is somebody who protects gold shipments being transported by stagecoach. Around the age of 35, Bullock began to achieve fame. It is claimed that Bullock had a part in the death of Black Hills outlaw Cornelius Donahue (also known as "Lame Johnny"), although some sources dispute this.  In later years Bullock was a stockbroker in Lead, South Dakota. He died at Thorncroft Sanatorium, Glendale, California, on February 7, 1920 at the age of 72.

References

 The Western Morning News, February 11, 1997
 Roger Kessell's webpage

1847 births
1921 deaths
English stockbrokers
American stockbrokers
American people of Cornish descent
British emigrants to the United States
People from St Columb Major
Free Methodist Church members
Gunslingers of the American Old West
American folklore
People from Lead, South Dakota